Akureyri (locally ) is a town in northern Iceland. It is Iceland's fifth-largest municipality, after Reykjavík, Hafnarfjörður, Reykjanesbær and Kópavogur, and the largest town outside Iceland's more populated southwest corner.   
 
Nicknamed the "Capital of North Iceland", Akureyri is an important port and fishing centre. The area where Akureyri is located was settled in the 9th century, but did not receive a municipal charter until 1786. Allied units were based in the town during World War II. Further growth occurred after the war as the Icelandic population increasingly moved to urban areas.

The area has a relatively mild climate because of geographical factors, and the town's ice-free harbour has played a significant role in its history.

History 

The Norse Viking Helgi magri (the slim) Eyvindarson originally settled the area in the 9th century. The first mention of Akureyri is in court records from 1562, when a woman was sentenced there for adultery. In the 17th century, Danish merchants based their camps at the current site of Akureyri, which was one of the numerous spits of land in Pollurinn. The main reasons for choosing this spot for trading operations were the outstanding natural harbour and the fertility of the area. The merchants did not live at Akureyri year-round, but returned home in the winter.

Permanent settlement at Akureyri started in 1778, and eight years later, the town was granted its municipal charter by the king Christian VII, along with five other towns in Iceland. The king hoped to improve the living conditions of Icelanders by this action, because at the time, Iceland had never had urban areas. As far as the king was concerned, Akureyri was unsuccessful, because it did not grow from its population of 12. It lost its municipal status in 1836, but regained it in 1862. From then on, Akureyri grew because of the excellent port conditions and perhaps more because of the productive agricultural region around it.  Agricultural products became an important sector of the economy.

During World War II, Akureyri was one of three air bases used by the Norwegian-British No. 330 Squadron RNoAF. The squadron, which was formed on 25 April 1941, flew Northrop N-3PB bombers: 'A' flight was based at RAF Reykjavik, 'B' flight at Akureyri and 'C' flight at Budareyri (Reyðarfjörður now). On 1 December 1940, 'A' and 'B' flights ceased operating from Norwegian bases, but 'C' flight continued to fly Northrop N-3PBs from Akureyri until 5 April 1943. No. 330 Squadron RNoAF also operated Catalina flying boats from Akureyri, which protected convoys between the United States, the United Kingdom, and Murmansk in northern Russia from attack by German submarines.

In the 20th century, Iceland experienced an exodus from the countryside to the towns. Commerce and service industries grew to be the primary employers in Akureyri in the 1990s. Jón Sveinsson, a popular author of children's books, was born in Akureyri and died in 1944.

In the early 21st century, fishing industries have become more important in Akureyri as two of the major fishing companies of Iceland have become a more important source of revenue and are expected to grow further in coming years. The University of Akureyri was founded in 1987 and is growing rapidly.

Since 2004, the former municipality of Hrísey, an island  to the north, has been a part of Akureyri. Hrísey, which has a population of 210, is the second-largest island off Iceland and is a site for pet and livestock quarantine. The settlement was previously the site of fishing processing. The town is located on the southern part of the island.  The northern part consists of privately owned land that requires passes to enter.

Geography 

It is surrounded by mountains, the highest being Strýta ;  to the west) and Kerling  at the head of Glerádalur ,  to the southwest. It has a narrow coastal strip of flat land; inland is a steep but low hill. In earlier times, a few spits of land (Icelandic: eyri, thus Akur-eyri) jutted from the narrow coast, but much land has since been reclaimed from the sea, so that today the coastline is more even except for the largest spit, Oddeyri , which was formed by the river Glerá, which runs through the town. The name of the town is possibly derived from the name of a field that may have been situated near some of the sheltered locations by the river.

The body of sea between Oddeyri and the end of the fjord is known as Pollurinn  ("The Pool") and is known for calm winds and a good natural harbour. Akureyri today is centered on Ráðhústorg  (Town Hall Square) near the northwest corner of Pollurinn. The districts of Akureyri are: Innbær , the oldest part of town on the strip of land between the hill and Pollurinn south of the central area; Brekkan , on top of the hill; Oddeyri on the peninsula of the same name; and Glerárhverfi  on the north bank of the Glerá (also referred to colloquially as Þorpið , 'the Village'). Because of the town's position at the head of a long fjord surrounded by high mountains, the climate is more typically inland than coastal, with greater variations in temperature (warmer summers, colder winters) than in many other inhabited parts of Iceland. However, the mountains shield the town from strong winds. The relatively warm climate (for its latitude) allows the botanical gardens to flourish without need of a greenhouse. The area around Akureyri has one of the warmest climates in Iceland, even though it is only  from the Arctic Circle.

Climate
Akureyri has either the rare dry-summer subarctic climate (Köppen: Dsc) if the 0 °C isotherm is used, or the very rare cold-summer mediterranean climate (Köppen: Csc) if the -3 °C isotherm is used, with cold though not severe winters and mild summers. The snow cover starts forming in late October and melts in April, yet snow can lie on the mountain peaks around Akureyri for the whole year. Akureyri is a very cloudy town, averaging only 1,029 sunshine hours annually, with barely any sunshine between November and February (which is also due to the town's location less than 100 km from the Arctic Circle), but precipitation is much lower than in southern Iceland because the prevailing winds are from the south — it is as little as a fifth as much as in Vík í Mýrdal.

Demographics 
On 1 January 2015, Akureyri had a population of 18,191; of whom 9,011 were males and 9,180 were females. About 3% of the population are foreign citizens, from 53 countries. In 2014, there were 229 births and 118 deaths in Akureyri. Immigration in 2014 was 1,097 individuals, while emigration was 1,122 residents. Population growth in 2014 was therefore 0.5%. The population in 1910 was 2,239, increasing to 7,711 in 1950 and 16,756 in 2005.

Crime
Crime statistics have been published by the Iceland national police for 2000.  Akureyri had a reported 726 nontraffic offences per 10,000 population compared with a national average of 892, while 2,891 traffic offences per 10,000 population were recorded compared with a national average of 2,397. Akureyri has five police officers on call. Incidents have occurred where insufficient police officers were on duty to respond to criminal activity in progress, as confirmed by the mayor. However, Akureyri, and Iceland in general, has one of the lowest crime rates in the world.

Economy 

The fishing industry has historically been a large and important part of the local economy. In recent years, other industries and business services have also begun. Higher education is also a growing sector in the local economy. About 20% of the work force is in the service industry.

Two of the five largest fishing companies in Iceland are headquartered in Akureyri, partly because of the ice-free port. Other large companies in Akureyri include Samherji, Norðurmjólk, Brim hf, and Vífilfell, the largest brewery in Iceland. Sjúkrahús Akureyrar (FSA/Akureyri Hospital) is a major employer in the area and is one of two major hospitals in Iceland.

Corporations pay a tax rate of 18% to the national government, which is one of the lowest in the world. No additional local corporate taxes are levied. Property tax, at 1.99%, accounts for most of the tax base. A local government deficit of ISK 1 billion (US$9 million) was anticipated in 2009, prompting a cut in salaries of the mayor, town councilors, and committee members by 10% and increases in local taxes and property taxes.

Culture 

Akureyri has a robust cultural scene, with several bars and reputable restaurants (such as "Greifinn", "Bautinn", "RUB 23 Steak/Sushi", "Kung Fu sushi bar" and "Götubarinn"). The Icelandic folk dance ensemble "Vefarinn" comes from Akureyri. Folk culture, in general, is more prevalent in Akureyri than in Reykjavík. During the summer, several festivals are held in Akureyri and the surrounding area. One example is the medieval festival held every summer at Gásir. The Akureyri International Music Festival, a concert series by bands, was held for the fourth time in 2009. The town has one of the largest libraries in the country.

Media 
The Vikudagur newspaper is published in Akureyri. The Icelandic National Broadcasting Service (Ríkisútvarpið) operates two radio channels nationwide. The several radio stations in Akureyri include FM Akureyri and Voice FM 98.7. Several television stations can be watched in Akureyri. N4 is a station whose studios are located in Akureyri. Initially a local channel, it began to broadcast nationwide in 2008.

Townscape 

Sites that have been cited as areas of interest include various museums, churches, and the Botanical Gardens. Local museums include the Minjasafnið á Akureyri (Akureyri Museum), Listasafnið á Akureyri (Akureyri Art Museum), Nonnahús (Nonni house or Jón Sveinsson Memorial Museum, for the writer), Davíðshús (David's house or Davíð Stefánsson Memorial Museum, for the poet), Akureyri Museum of Industry, a motorcycle museum, and Flugsafn Íslands (Aviation Museum of Iceland).  The most northerly 18 hole golf course in the world is in the town. The Náttúrufræðistofnun Norðurlands (Nature Museum) was opened in 1957 and is in the grounds of the Akureyri Botanical Garden. The Botanical Gardens (Lystigarður Akureyrar) are located in Spítalavegur.  Large churches include the Akureyrarkirkja (The church of Akureyri) and Glerárkirkja (The church of Glerá). Sundlaug Akureyrar is a swimming pool in Akureyri.

New residential and commercial growth has required an extension of electricity and water distribution, as well as new water drilling.  Much of the town is heated geothermally.

Administration

Law and government 
Akureyri is governed by a town council, directly elected by those over 18 with registered domicile in the town. The council has 11 members, who are elected for four-year terms. The mayor is appointed by the council: usually one of the council members is chosen, but they may also appoint a mayor who is not a member of the council.

The last elections to the town council were held on May 31, 2014. The People's List (Listi fólksins), which won an outright majority in 2010, and The Town List (Bæjarlistinn) merged into L-list, the Town List of Akureyri. They had seven representatives together, but now have only two, 18.8%. The Independence Party (Sjálfstæðisflokkurinn) received the most votes, three seats in the council, 25.8%, instead of only one previously. Social Democratic Alliance (Samfylkingin) and Progressive Party (Framsóknarflokkurinn) each got two seats instead of the previous one each. Left-Green Movement (Vinstri hreyfingin grænt framboð) and Bright Future (Björt framtíð) each got one seat. L-list, Social Democratic Alliance, and the Progressive Party formed a new majority in the council. The new majority decided that Eiríkur Björn Björgvinsson, mayor of Akureyri since 2010, would continue to serve as mayor.

Timeline of mayors 
 1919–1934 - Jón Sveinsson
 1934–1958 - Steinn Steinsen
 1958–1967 - Magnús Guðjónsson
 1967–1976 - Bjarni Einarsson
 1976–1986 - Helgi M. Bergs
 1986–1990 - Sigfús Jónsson
 1990–1994 - Halldór Jónsson
 1994–1998 - Jakob Björnsson
 1998–2007 - Kristján Þór Júlíusson
 2007–2009 - Sigrún Björk Jakobsdóttir
 2009–2010 - Hermann Jón Tómasson
 2010–2018 - Eiríkur Björn Björgvinsson
 2018–present - Ásthildur Sturludóttir

Twin towns — sister cities

Akureyri is twinned with:

 Ålesund, Norway
 Denver, United States
 Gimli, Canada
 Hafnarfjörður, Iceland
 Lahti, Finland
 Murmansk, Russia
 Narsaq, Greenland
 Randers, Denmark
 Vágur, Faroe Islands
 Västerås, Sweden

In 2007, a friendship and fisheries agreement was signed with Grimsby, United Kingdom, which according to Ice News, might lead to a twin cities designation in the future.

Education

There are two high schools (junior colleges) in Akureyri, one of them being the second oldest in Iceland. The Menntaskólinn á Akureyri is a junior college in Akureyri and so is the Verkmenntaskólinn á Akureyri (Akureyri Vocational College). The University of Akureyri (Háskólinn á Akureyri) was founded in 1987. There are 3 faculties or colleges, the Faculty of Business and Science, Faculty of Humanities and Social Sciences and Faculty of Health Sciences. The university offers master's degrees in several subjects.

Transport

Airport 

Akureyri Airport, one of four international airports in Iceland and the only international airport in the north of the country, was constructed in 1955 replacing the airstrip at Melgerdismelar further to the south. The current airport is mostly used for domestic flights, with seasonal scheduled international flights and flights to Nerlerit Inaat in Greenland throughout the whole year. Icelandair flies several times a day to Reykjavík, and there are also domestic flights to Grímsey (a small island to the north) and to Vopnafjörður and Þórshöfn (both small settlements in northeast Iceland).

In 2007, Akureyri Airport had a passenger traffic level of 221,200 and 19,778 aircraft movements.

Marine port 
The port of Akureyri is vital to the town, which largely bases its livelihood on fisheries. It is the site of large fish processing plants and has docking facilities for trawlers. It is also important for freight handling and for tourism, as cruise ships stop in Akureyri during the summer months. The ice-free nature of the port has been important in the town's establishment.

Bus 
SBA-Norðurleið (Icelandic Bus Company - northern route) is an Akureyri-based company that provides a long-distance bus service to the town. Local bus services within Akureyri are provided by the SVA (Akureyri Bus Company), which does not charge fares. The cessation of fares in 2008 resulted in an increase of 130% in passenger numbers compared to the previous year when fares were charged.

Roads 
The road is mostly one lane in each direction, but is paved and open year-round. There are no paved roads from Akureyri to the unpopulated interior of the island. However, the F821 mountain road is open in summer: it climbs southwards from Akureyri and connects with the F26 mountain road across the interior to the SW of the country. Parking in the central area requires use of a parking disc indicating the time that parking has commenced. Parking is free but is limited in certain areas to a maximum period ranging from 15 minutes to 2 hours.

It ran overbudget and was one of Iceland's most expensive tunnel projects, encountering political and engineering difficulties. The total project cost is estimated to be between ISK 16-17 billion (US$160–170 million/EUR 130-138 million) reaching double the initially estimated ISK 8.7 billion.

Utilities 
Akureyri has been heated geothermally since the late 1970s. Starting in 1928, there were unsuccessful attempts to develop geothermal energy. During this period, electricity and oil were used for heating. Construction of a geothermal distribution system was begun in 1976 after the discovery of a commercially viable source in 1975. Distribution was widespread by 1979.

The Laugaland field near Akureyri was the first geothermal source commercially developed. The Ytri-Tjarnir field followed. Water temperature is generally  but can drop to  during hot summer days. The cost of geothermal production is, at 32 mill/kwh, higher than the Icelandic national average of 11, but slightly less than the cost of imported heating oil. There is diminishing excess capacity but there are known and untapped resources near the town. Furthermore, there have been proposals to reinject water to extend the life of the sources.

Sports
Knattspyrnufélag Akureyrar (KA) and Þór Akureyri are the two biggest multi-sport clubs in the town. They field teams in several sports, such as basketball, football and handball.

The most successful football team of late in the town has been Þór/KA, a joint women's team from KA and Þór. Since 2008, it has finished in the top four in the top-tier Úrvalsdeild kvenna, winning the national championship in 2012 and 2017. The clubs also have two men's football teams under their own names.

The clubs field a joint team in women's handball, KA/Þór. They fielded a joint men's team under the name Akureyri Handboltafélag from 2016 to 2017 before KA broke off from the cooperation and fielded a separate team in 2017–2018.

In basketball, Þór fields both men's and women's team. Its women's team has won the national championship three times: in 1969, 1971 and 1976.

The town's ice hockey team, Skautafélag Akureyrar, is the most successful team in the history of the Icelandic Hockey League, with 20 championships from 1992 to 2018.

The Akureyri Golf Club is the second oldest golf club in Iceland behind the Reykjavík Golf Club.  It was established in 1935 and is the annual location of The Arctic Open held each summer solstice. The town is also the birthplace of Icelandic footballers Birkir Bjarnason and Aron Gunnarsson, as well as mixed martial arts fighter Gunnar Nelson.

See also
Sandgerðisbót

References

References
.
.
.
 (In Icelandic and English.)
 (In Icelandic and English.)
 (In English.)
 (In English.)

External links 

 
 University of Akureyri
 SCA Shire of Klakavirki, based in Akureyri

 
Populated places in Northeastern Region (Iceland)
Municipalities of Iceland